The 2014 Esso Cup was Canada's sixth annual national women's midget hockey championship, which was held April 20–26, 2014 at Hamilton, Ontario. The Weyburn Gold Wings of Saskatchewan defeated the Edmonton Thunder of Alberta to win the gold medal. With the second-place finish, the Thunder continued their streak by taking home a medal for the fifth consecutive year.

Teams

Note: The Pacific region was awarded a second spot in this year's Esso Cup as Quebec did not participate.

Round robin

Standings

Scores
Sunday, April 20
 Weyburn 2 - Sudbury 1
 Edmonton 1 - Fraser Valley 0
 Stoney Creek 8 - Moncton 1

Monday, April 21
 Weyburn 4 - Edmonton 2
 Sudbury 5 - Moncton 1
 Stoney Creek 3 - Fraser Valley 0

Tuesday, April 22
 Moncton 5 - Edmonton 4
 Weyburn 3 - Fraser Valley 2
 Stoney Creek 2 - Sudbury 1

Wednesday, April 23
 Fraser Valley 7 - Moncton 2
 Sudbury 3 - Edmonton 2
 Stoney Creek 3 - Weyburn 2

Thursday, April 24
 Sudbury 6 - Fraser Valley 3
 Weyburn 3 - Moncton 2
 Edmonton 4 - Stoney Creek 3

Playoffs

Individual awards
 Most Valuable Player: Alex Poznikoff (Edmonton)
 Top Scorer: Karli Shell (Sudbury)
 Top Forward: Karli Shell (Sudbury)
 Top Defenceman: Jessica Healey (Edmonton)
 Top Goaltender: Jane Kish (Weyburn)
 Most Sportsmanlike Player: Claire Merrick (Stoney Creek)

Road to the Esso Cup

Atlantic Region
Tournament held April 3 – 6 at Deer Lake, Newfoundland and Labrador.

Bronze Medal Game
Kings County 3 - NL Central 1 (OT)
Gold Medal Game
Moncton 2 - East Hants 1Moncton advanced to Esso CupQuebec
Quebec elected to withdraw from this year's competition. Hockey Canada awarded this berth to the Pacific Region.

Ontario
Ontario Women's Hockey Association Championship played April 10 – 13, 2014 at Toronto, OntarioSudbury advanced to Esso CupWestern Region
Best-of-3 played April 4–6 at Weyburn, Saskatchewan.Weyburn advanced to Esso CupPacific Region

The Pacific region was awarded two spots in this year's Esso Cup as the Quebec region did not field a team.Edmonton and Fraser Valley advanced to Esso Cup''

See also
 Esso Cup

References

External links
 2014 Esso Cup Home Page at HockeyCanada.com

Esso Cup
Esso Cup
Sports competitions in Hamilton, Ontario
21st century in Hamilton, Ontario